Aya is a 1990 Australian film directed by Solrun Hoaas and starring Eri Ishida, Nicholas Eadie, and Chris Haywood. The plot is about a marriage between an Australian man and Japanese war bride.

Plot
Aya, a Japanese war bride, arrives in a small Australian town during the 1950s with her husband. She is still very much in love with her husband, named Frank, but she somehow feels more comfortable with Mac, a friend of Frank's who can speak Japanese.

References

External links
 
 Aya at Oz Movies

1990 films
Australian drama films
1990 drama films
Films scored by Roger Mason (musician)
Films about marriage
1990s English-language films
1990s Australian films